Linda Jane Leith  is a Montreal-based writer, translator, and publisher.

Biography
Leith was born in Belfast, Northern Ireland, when her family was living in the linen town of Lisburn. After elementary and secondary schooling in London and Basel, Switzerland, she moved to Montreal with her family as an adolescent.

She graduated from McGill University in Montreal in 1970, and then studied in Paris and was awarded her PhD from Queen Mary College of the University of London in 1975.

A member of the Department of English at John Abbott College in Sainte-Anne-de-Bellevue, Quebec, 1976–2000, Leith has also taught at Concordia University and at McGill University in Montreal. In 1990, she spent two years in Budapest, Hungary, with her Hungarian-born first husband and their children. It was here where she wrote her first novel. 

The founder of Blue Metropolis Foundation, she spent fourteen years as president and artistic director of Blue Metropolis, the first multilingual literary festival in the world. 

Leith stepped aside from Blue Metropolis in 2010 and founded a literary publishing company, Linda Leith Publishing and the online literary forum Salon .ll. in 2011.

She is the author, most recently, of The Girl from Dream City: A Literary Life, published by the University of Regina Press in April 2021. Earlier works of nonfiction works include the literary history Writing in the Time of Nationalism, which The Globe and Mail called "a very fine book," "written in clear, exhilarating prose," and Marrying Hungary, as well as Introducing Hugh MacLennan's Two Solitudes.  She is the author of three novels: Birds of Passage (1993), The Tragedy Queen (1995), and The Desert Lake (2007) all published by Signature Editions.

She was awarded the Quebec Writers' Federation Community Award in 2003  and Canada's Commissioner of Official Languages' first Award of Excellence – Promotion of Linguistic Duality, in 2009. She was awarded the Queen Elizabeth II Diamond Jubilee Medal for her "contribution to Canada" in 2012 and in 2020 was appointed an Officer of the Order of Canada.

Bibliography

Novels
 Birds of Passage, Signature Editions, 1993
 The Tragedy Queen, Signature Editions, 1995 (translated into French by Agnès Guitard, as Un Amour de Salomé, XYZ, 2002)
 The Desert Lake, Signature Editions, 2007

Non-fiction
 Marrying Hungary, Signature Editions, 2008 (translated into French by Aline Apostolska, as Épouser la Hongrie, Leméac, 2004; translated into Serbian by Aleksandra Mančić, as U braku sa Mađarskom, Rad, 2005)
 Writing in the Time of Nationalism: From Two Solitudes to Blue Metropolis, Signature Editions, 2010 (translated into French by Alain Roy, as Écrire au temps du nationalisme, Leméac, 2014)
 The Girl from Dream City: A Literary Life, University of Regina Press, 2021.

References

Black, Barbara. "Linda Leith turns a page in her literary career." Concordia University Journal 11 October, 2007.
Lemay, Daniel. "Linda Leith, militante du rapprochement." La Presse 3 May, 2014.

External links

Blue Metropolis Foundation
Linda Leith Publishing
Signature Editions: authors: Linda Leith 
Leméac: auteurs: Linda Leith

Writers from Montreal
Canadian women novelists
20th-century Canadian novelists
Anglophone Quebec people
Canadian women essayists
21st-century Canadian novelists
20th-century Canadian women writers
21st-century Canadian women writers
Northern Ireland emigrants to Canada
Officers of the Order of Canada
Living people
20th-century Canadian essayists
21st-century Canadian essayists
Year of birth missing (living people)